Filippovo is a rural locality (a selo) in Valuysky District, Belgorod Oblast, Russia. The population was 81 as of 2010. There are 2 streets.

Geography 
Filippovo is located 28 km north of Valuyki (the district's administrative centre) by road. Verkhny Moisey is the nearest rural locality.

References 

Rural localities in Valuysky District